Max Gray was an Australian Rugby League footballer who played in the 1930s and 1940s.  He played for Western Suburbs in the NSWRL competition.

Playing career
Gray made his first grade debut for Western Suburbs in Round 1 1934 against Balmain at Leichhardt Oval.  In the same season, Western Suburbs went from wooden spooners in 1933 to winning the minor premiership and premiership in 1934.  

The change in form was attributed to the fact that Western Suburbs lost players such as Frank McMillan and Alan Ridley who were away on tour with the Australian team when the club finished last but returned for the start of the 1934 season.  

Gray played in the 1934 grand final victory over Eastern Suburbs at the Sydney Sports Ground.  The final had been delayed for over a week due to heavy rain and Wests went into the match as underdogs with Easts boasting players such as future immortal David Brown, Viv Thicknesse, Ray Stehr, Andy Norval and Cliff Pearce.  As of the 2019 season, no other team since Western Suburbs has come from last place to winning the premiership the following year.

Gray was captain-coach of West Wyalong when they won the 1938 Group 9 premiership.

Gray returned to play with Western Suburbs until the end of 1940 before retiring.

References

Western Suburbs Magpies players
Australian rugby league players
Rugby league locks
Rugby league second-rows
Year of birth missing
Place of birth missing
Year of death missing
Place of death missing